"Winner" is Rythem's thirteenth single. It was released on October 10, 2007, by Sony Music Entertainment Japan. The title track was used as the theme song for NHK's Minna no Uta for the month of October to November 2007. The single reached number 52 on the Oricon weekly charts.

Track listing
WINNER
Composition/Lyrics: Rythem
Arrangement: Masuda TOSH
Kamereon Kamen
Composition/Lyrics: Yui Nītsu
Arrangement: Masuda TOSH
WINNER (Karaoke)

2007 singles
Rythem songs
2007 songs